Castle Batch was a fortification at Worle that once stood overlooking the town of Weston-super-Mare in Somerset, England.

Details
Castle Batch was a motte constructed by the Norman lord Walter of Douai between the Norman conquest of England in 1066 and 1086. The entrance was probably on the north side of the motte. A possible bailey has been identified alongside the motte. Although typically characterised as a motte, the mound has a slight indentation in the centre and archaeologist Stuart Prior considers the mound to have been a ringwork.

Around 1200 the estate belonged to William De Courtney  and by 1303 by John de Beauchamp.

In the 21st century the site forms part of local parkland, and is protected by law as a scheduled monument.

See also
Castles in Great Britain and Ireland
List of castles in England

References

Castles in Somerset
Scheduled monuments in North Somerset